Altofonte (Sicilian: Parcu) is a comune (municipality) in the Metropolitan City of Palermo in the Italian region Sicily, located about  southwest of Palermo.

Altofonte borders the following municipalities: Belmonte Mezzagno, Monreale, Palermo, Piana degli Albanesi, San Giuseppe Jato.

Main sights
 Church of Santa Maria in Altofonte, built in 1633.
 Church of San Michele Arcangelo (early 12th century)

Demographic evolution

References

External links
 Official website

Municipalities of the Metropolitan City of Palermo
Articles which contain graphical timelines